"Not Too Amused" is a song by Sebadoh from their 1994 album Bakesale.  It was released as a CD Single and 7" vinyl record.

Track listing 
UK CD Single and 7" Single (RUG38)
 "Not Too Amused"
 "Hank Williams"
 "Not Too Amused (Live)"

References 

Sebadoh songs
1995 singles
Domino Recording Company singles